This is a list of flag bearers who have represented Liechtenstein at the Olympics.

Flag bearers carry the national flag of their country at the opening ceremony of the Olympic Games.

See also
Liechtenstein at the Olympics

References

Liechtenstein at the Olympics
Liechtenstein
Olympic flagbearers
Olympics